Group Film Productions was a British film production company that made movies through the Rank Organisation. It was wholly owned by Rank, and followed a similar company, British Film Makers, which had made fourteen titles. It would be followed in turn by Rank Organisation Film Productions, which made 96 films between 1953 and 1967.

Select Credits
The Little Kidnappers (1953)
The Million Pound Note (1954)
You Know What Sailors Are (1954)
Fast and Loose (1954)
Doctor in the House (1954)
Up to His Neck (1954)
The Young Lovers (1954)
Mad About Men (1954)
Simba (1955)
As Long as They're Happy (1955)
Passage Home (1955)
Doctor at Sea (1955)
Value for Money (1955)
The Woman for Joe (1955)
Simon and Laura (1955)
Man of the Moment (1955)
All for Mary (1955)
Doctor at Large (1956)

References

External links
Group Film Productions at IMDb

Film production companies of the United Kingdom